Mohammad Hassan Zolfaghari (well known as Amoo Hassan) was an Iranian professional basketball player (1967–1971) and Iran's Head coach (1981). He played as the forward position. Zolfagari was also the head coach of Faravahar (Zoroastrian Team of Iran, 1974–1994) as well as "Shahin of Tehran" (1972–1979).

Death

In September 2013, he died after a long illness.

References

Iranian men's basketball players
Iranian basketball coaches
2013 deaths
Year of birth missing